"Not That Kind" is a song by American recording artist Anastacia from her debut album, Not That Kind (2000). Written by Will Wheaton, Marvin Young and Anastacia, the song was performed originally on the MTV talent show The Cut in 1998, which in turn helped the singer receive a record deal. The song was released as the album's second single on October 2, 2000, by Daylight Records and Epic Records, reaching the top 20 in nine European countries.

Critical reception
William Ruhlmann of AllMusic marked this song as a highlight and wrote: "funk style reminiscent of Aretha Franklin's '80s work."

Music video
Directed by Marc Webb, the music video for "Not That Kind" was shot in New York City. It opens with Anastacia singing the song in a club. There are also shots of Anastacia in a cafe, shown that she is chatting with her girlfriend. Other times, her boyfriend is trying to hit on her, but she teases him away to show him that she is "not that kind of girl".

Track listings

US maxi-CD single
 "Not That Kind" (album version) – 3:20
 "Not That Kind" (Kerri Chandler mix – radio edit) – 3:46
 "Not That Kind" (Maurice Joshua's Chickenpox mix) – 3:33
 "Black Roses" – 3:38
 "I'm Outta Love" (video)

UK CD single
 "Not That Kind" (album version) – 3:20
 "Not That Kind" (Kerri Chandler vocal mix) – 6:52
 "Not That Kind" (Maurice's Chicken Pox club mix) – 7:32
 "Not That Kind" (video version)

UK cassette single
 "Not That Kind" (album version) – 3:20
 "Not That Kind" (Kerri Chandler mix – radio edit) – 3:43
 "Black Roses" – 3:38

European CD single
 "Not That Kind" (album version) – 3:20
 "Not That Kind" (Ric Wake's mix) – 4:50
 "Not That Kind" (Maurice's Chicken Pox club mix) – 7:32

European maxi-CD single
 "Not That Kind" (album version) – 3:20
 "Not That Kind" (Ric Wake club final) – 7:59
 "Not That Kind" (Kerri Chandler mix) – 3:34
 "Not That Kind" (Maurice Joshua's Chickenpox mix) – 3:33
 "Not That Kind" (LT's Not That Dub mix) – 7:13

Australian CD single
 "Not That Kind" – 3:20
 "Nothin' at All" – 4:29
 "I'm Outta Love" (Matty's Soulflower mix) – 5:56
 "Not That Kind" (Ric Wake club final) – 7:58
 "Not That Kind" (Kerri Chandler vocal mix) – 6:52
 "Not That Kind" (Kerri Chandler organ dub) – 6:52
 "Not That Kind" (Maurice's Chicken Pox club mix) – 7:32

Credits and personnel
Credits are adapted from the Not That Kind album booklet.

Studios
 Recorded at The Dream Factory (New York City) and Cove City Sound Studios (Glen Cove, New York)
 Mixed at Cove City Sound Studios (Glen Cove, New York)
 Mastered at Gateway Mastering (Portland, Maine, US)

Personnel

 Anastacia – writing, vocals, background vocals, background vocal arrangement
 Will Wheaton – writing
 Marvin Young – writing
 BeBe Winans – background vocals, background vocal arrangement
 Eric Kupper – guitars, keyboards
 Richie Jones – drums, arrangement, mixing
 Ric Wake – production, arrangement
 "Young" Dave Scheuer – recording
 Thomas R. Yezzi – recording (vocals)
 Dan Hetzel – mix engineering
 Jim Annunziato – assistant mix engineer
 Joe Ernst – assistant mix engineer
 Marc Russell – production coordination
 Bob Ludwig – mastering

Charts

Weekly charts

Year-end charts

Certifications

Release history

References

2000 singles
2000 songs
Anastacia songs
Daylight Records singles
Epic Records singles
Songs written by Anastacia
Songs written by Will Wheaton
Songs written by Young MC